Michail Gregory Antonio (born 28 March 1990) is a professional footballer who plays as a forward for  club West Ham United. Born in England, he represents the Jamaica national team.

Antonio began his career at non-League club Tooting & Mitcham United before signing with Reading of the Championship in 2008. The club sent him on subsequent loan spells to Cheltenham Town, back to Tooting & Mitcham, Southampton and Colchester United, as he struggled to find a place in Reading's first team throughout his four-year stay at the Madejski. A final loan spell with Sheffield Wednesday resulted in a permanent move in 2012, where he went on to make 64 appearances and score 12 goals. Nottingham Forest signed him from Wednesday in 2014, where his 16 goals in 50 appearances attracted attention from West Ham United of the Premier League, who signed him in 2015, where he was deployed in a number of positions including right back, right midfielder and as a winger before eventually establishing himself as the club's main striker. On 23 August 2021, he became West Ham United's all-time top scorer in the Premier League.

Club career

Early career
Antonio was born in Wandsworth, Greater London. He began playing football as a youth at Tooting & Mitcham United Juniors at the age of 12 and remained there for six seasons. He was scouted and invited for a trial by Tottenham Hotspur at the age of 14, though, his mother rejected the opportunity on his behalf and he remained with Tooting and Mitcham; he would also later unsuccessfully trial with both Brentford and Queens Park Rangers as a teenager. The Juniors' team was independent from Tooting & Mitcham United, whom he later signed for at the age of 17 years. He made his debut for the club in an away match against Wealdstone at the age of 18, scoring once in a 3–0 victory.

Reading
After just a handful of first-team appearances for Tooting & Mitcham United, Antonio signed for Championship club Reading on 28 October 2008 for an undisclosed fee, signing a deal until 2010. He rejoined Tooting on a month-long loan spell on 9 January 2009, with the loan extended for a further month on 11 February but he returned to Reading less than a week later on 17 February after being recalled by the club.

Following his loan spell with Southampton in the summer of 2010, Antonio signed a fresh deal to keep him at Reading until 2013. He featured more regularly in the squad during the 2010–11 season, scoring one goal, against Burnley, in 24 appearances in all competitions.

Cheltenham Town (loan)
After being recalled from Tooting, Antonio was subsequently loaned out to League One club Cheltenham Town on a month's loan, commencing on 19 February.

He made his Football League debut in a 2–0 defeat to Leeds United on 21 February, being substituted on 28 minutes after suffering from an ankle injury. After spending some time out injured, Antonio would go on to make eight further appearances until the end of the season with Cheltenham.

Southampton (loan)
Southampton signed Antonio on loan for one month on 5 October 2009, making his debut on 9 October in a 3–1 away win at Southend United. He scored his first goal for Southampton in the FA Cup victory over Bristol Rovers on 6 November. The loan was subsequently extended until the end of the season.

He scored in the first leg of the Football League Trophy area final against Milton Keynes Dons, with the match finishing 1–0. He also scored in his next appearance, a 2–1 victory over Ipswich Town in the FA Cup. He scored again in the 4–1 2010 Football League Trophy Final win over Carlisle United at Wembley Stadium on 28 March 2010, which was his 20th birthday, bringing Antonio his first silverware.

Antonio's loan deal finished at the end of the 2009–10 season, but both manager Alan Pardew and Antonio himself expressed a desire for the winger to remain at Southampton.

Colchester United (loan)
Colchester United was the next destination for Antonio, where he signed on a one-month loan on 15 August 2011. He made his debut for the club the following day in a 2–0 home defeat to Charlton Athletic. He scored his first goal for the club to put the U's 2–1 ahead as they eventually lost in a 3–2 defeat to Huddersfield Town on 20 August. His loan spell with the club was extended for another month in September and then for a further month in October. In total, Antonio scored four goals in 15 league outings for Colchester.

Sheffield Wednesday
On 21 February 2012, Sheffield Wednesday signed Antonio on an emergency loan deal until the end of the season. His debut for the Owls came in a 1–0 victory over local rivals, Sheffield United on 26 February. In his next appearance, a 4–1 win against Bury, he scored two and set up another for forward Ryan Lowe. In the following match, against Bournemouth, Antonio set up the opener and scored Wednesday's third in the opening ten minutes. On 21 April 2012, against Carlisle United at Hillsborough, he scored a 95th-minute winner to beat them and put Sheffield Wednesday only one point behind local rivals United, who were in second place. He helped the Owls to promotion on the final day of the season by scoring the first in a 2–0 victory over already relegated Wycombe Wanderers, which led Wednesday to finish above Steel city rivals Sheffield United.

Antonio signed on a permanent basis for Sheffield Wednesday on 6 August 2012 on a four-year deal after a third and final bid for the player was accepted by Reading. In his first season with the club, Antonio had been leading the scoring charts with nine goals, but an injury suffered in a 2–0 defeat by Cardiff City on 16 March 2013 ruled him out for the rest of the season.

Nottingham Forest
On 6 August 2014, Antonio signed a three-year contract with Nottingham Forest for a transfer fee in the region of £1.5 million.

Antonio's strong form in Forest's first five league matches of the season, in which he contributed three goals and three assists, led to him being named as a candidate for the Championship's Player of the Month award for August. Antonio lost out on the award to Charlton's Igor Vetokele. Antonio started every league match for Forest during his first season with the club, scoring 14 goals, and was named Forest's Player of the Season on 4 May 2015.

On 11 August 2015, Antonio scored a brace in a 3–4 loss to League One club Walsall in the first round of the League Cup. On 15 August, the winger scored the winner in a 2–1 victory at home to Rotherham to open his tally for the new season.

Having already rejected a bid of £4 million from West Bromwich Albion for the transfer of Antonio earlier that summer, Forest received a second bid of £4 million from arch-rivals Derby County. Consequently, Antonio was left out of Forest's Championship match against Charlton Athletic on 19 August 2015, with his manager Dougie Freedman citing that the winger was not "in the right frame of mind" to play. However, Antonio returned for the next league match at Bolton Wanderers. On 26 August, West Ham United joined the bidding for Antonio, offering Forest £4 million and winger Matt Jarvis on a season-long loan.

West Ham United

2015–2017

On 1 September 2015, Antonio signed for Premier League club West Ham United for around £7 million on a four-year contract with an option for a further two years. He made his debut on 19 September, replacing Victor Moses in the 60th minute of West Ham's 2–1 Premier League win at Manchester City. In a Man of the match performance on 28 December 2015 in a 2–1 win, Antonio scored his first goal for West Ham. With the team losing 1–0 to Southampton, Antonio equalised when a clearance hit him and looped over Southampton goalkeeper, Maarten Stekelenburg.

On 27 February, Antonio scored the only goal in a home win over Sunderland. He celebrated by lying on his side and spinning in a circle, imitating a celebration by The Simpsons character Homer Simpson in the episode "Last Exit to Springfield". In his next appearance, Antonio turned-in a Man of the match performance, scoring the only goal in a home win against Tottenham Hotspur. He followed this with another goal in a 3–2 away win at Everton three days later as West Ham came from two goals down. In July 2016, Antonio signed a new, four-year contract with West Ham.

Antonio started West Ham's first match of the 2016–17 season in the right-back position, subsequently giving away a penalty in the early stages of the second half, which was converted by Eden Hazard, to give Chelsea a 1–0 lead. He was substituted not long after for Sam Byram. Chelsea went on to win 2–1. In the second match of the season, on 21 August 2016, Antonio returned to his favourite position of winger. He scored the only goal of the match, from a cross by Gökhan Töre, in a 1–0 win against Bournemouth; West Ham's first Premier League match and goal at their new ground, the London Stadium. In April 2017, having scored nine goals for West Ham, Antonio was ruled out for the remainder of the season with what was described by manager, Slaven Bilić, as a "significant injury". For his performances during the 2016–17 season, Antonio was named Hammer of the Year. On 11 May 2017, West Ham announced that Antonio had signed a new, four-year contract.

2017–2021

Antonio scored the first goal by a visiting player at the new Tottenham Hotspur Stadium, on 27 April 2019, as West Ham won 1–0, becoming the first away team to win at the stadium.

On 11 July 2020, Antonio scored all four goals in a 4–0 win for West Ham over Norwich City, becoming the first player in West Ham's history to score four goals in a single Premier League game and the first West Ham player to score four goals in a game since David Cross against Tottenham in September 1981.

On 22 July 2020, Antonio scored his 10th Premier League goal of the season, his best return in the top division of English football, in West Ham's 1–1 draw with Manchester United at Old Trafford. The result also secured West Ham's place in the Premier League for the following season. In December 2020, Antonio signed a new, three-year contract committing himself to the club until 2023.

Antonio finished the 2020–21 season as West Ham's joint top-scorer, alongside Tomáš Souček, with ten goals.

2021–22 season

On 15 August 2021, Antonio scored his 47th Premier League goal for the club, in a 4–2 victory away to Newcastle United, in West Ham United's opening match of the 2021–22 season. The goal drew him level with the club's all time record top scorer in the Premier League era, Paolo Di Canio. On 23 August, he scored a brace in West Ham's 4–1 home win against Leicester City to eclipse Di Canio's record. His goal celebration involved him running to the substitutes’ bench and hoisting a cardboard cut-out of himself above his head, drawing inspiration from actors Patrick Swayze and Jennifer Grey in the musical movie Dirty Dancing.

On 10 September 2021, he was named as Premier League Player of the Month for August 2021. Antonio scored West Ham’s first goal in a 2–0 win against Dinamo Zagreb, on 16 September in their opening game in the 2021–22 UEFA Europa League group stage. It was West Ham’s first goal in major European competition since 1999.
On 25 September 2021, Antonio was subjected to racist abuse by a Leeds United supporter during a game a Elland Road. The offender was banned from attending any football match for four years after he was convicted of two offences at a trial at Leeds Magistrates' Court and given an eight-week prison sentence, suspended for 12 months.

On 7 January 2022, Antonio signed a new two and a half year deal with West Ham United, with the option to extend a further year.

International career
In March 2016, Antonio revealed that he had rejected the opportunity to play for Jamaica internationally and that he harboured an ambition of playing for England.

On 28 August 2016, in new England manager Sam Allardyce's first squad, Antonio was called up for the first time, for a 2018 World Cup qualification match against Slovakia in Slovakia on 4 September 2016 where he was an unused substitute. On 16 March 2017, Antonio was called up by new England manager Gareth Southgate's squad for the friendly match against Germany on 22 March and the 2018 World Cup qualifier against Lithuania on 26 March; however, on 20 March, Antonio withdrew from the squad after picking up a hamstring injury.

In February 2021, Antonio was again approached by Jamaica to consider playing for them at international level. He was said to be passionate about playing and helping them reach the 2022 World Cup. In March 2021, Antonio was reported to be in the process of obtaining his Jamaican passport. On 17 March 2021, it was reported that Antonio had decided he was going to represent Jamaica internationally, ahead of the squad being announced for an upcoming international friendly against the United States. Despite this, Antonio was not included in the 19-man squad when this was announced on 17 March. The BBC reported that Antonio was still to decide whether to switch. TalkSPORT reported on the same day that he had pledged to play for Jamaica.

On 18 June 2021, Antonio was named in Jamaica's 60-man provisional squad for the 2021 CONCACAF Gold Cup. Antonio missed out on the final 23-man squad, by virtue of not having secured his Jamaican passport in time. In August 2021, The Athletic reported Antonio had received his passport, making him eligible to play for the country. He was subsequently called up for a 35-man squad for upcoming World Cup fixtures against Mexico, Panama and Costa Rica although COVID-19 travel restrictions do not allow him to enter either Mexico or Costa Rica. He debuted with Jamaica in a 3–0 2022 FIFA World Cup qualification loss to Panama on 5 September 2021. His debut lasted 70 minutes. He spent much of the game isolated with little service from his team on what was described as a hard and dry pitch.
Antonio scored his first goal for Jamaica in his second international appearance. In a World Cup qualifying game against El Salvador on 13 November, Antonio scored the opening goal before Alex Roldan equalised for El Salvador as the game finished 1–1.

Style of play 
Antonio is a player who has been touted for his versatility throughout his time at West Ham. Antonio has played as a right back, right midfielder, winger and striker throughout his years at the club. Antonio said in 2016 however that his preferred position was on the wing.

Personal life
Antonio is married and has four children. 

In February 2019, Antonio suggested that clubs whose fans engage in racial abuse should be deducted points. 

During the 2019 United Kingdom general election, Antonio endorsed Sara Kumar, the Conservative Party candidate in the West Ham constituency.

Career statistics

Club

International

Scores and results list Jamaica's goal tally first, score column indicates score after each Antonio goal.

Honours
Southampton
Football League Trophy: 2009–10

Sheffield Wednesday
Football League One runner-up: 2011–12

Individual
Nottingham Forest Player of the Year: 2014–15
West Ham United Hammer of the Year: 2016–17
Premier League Player of the Month: July 2020, August 2021

References

External links

 Michail Antonio at West Ham United F.C. (archive)
 
 
 
 

1990 births
Living people
Black British sportsmen
Footballers from Wandsworth
Jamaican footballers
Jamaica international footballers
English footballers
English sportspeople of Jamaican descent
Citizens of Jamaica through descent
Association football wingers
Tooting & Mitcham United F.C. players
Reading F.C. players
Cheltenham Town F.C. players
Southampton F.C. players
Colchester United F.C. players
Sheffield Wednesday F.C. players
Nottingham Forest F.C. players
West Ham United F.C. players
Isthmian League players
English Football League players
Premier League players